The Blue Aeroplanes are an English rock band from Bristol, the mainstays of which have been Gerard Langley, brother John Langley, and dancer Wojtek Dmochowski. All three had previously been members of the new wave "art band" Art Objects from 1978 to 1981.

History
The Blue Aeroplanes first performed under that name at the King Street Art Gallery in Bristol in 1981. They consisted mainly of former members of Art Objects, with the addition of Nick Jacobs, former guitarist and vocalist of Southampton band the Exploding Seagulls. The same line-up played three or four concerts over the next couple of years, either at the gallery or for benefits, including a Karl Marx centenary performance at the Victoria Rooms, with the addition of trumpet and didgeridoo. The Blue Aeroplanes' first album Bop Art was released on their own Party Records in 1984, and was rapidly picked up by the Abstract (US) and Fire (UK) labels. It contained material that had been considered as a follow-up to Art Objects' only album, Bagpipe Music. Gerard Langley's largely spoken poetic lyrics were combined with a heavily guitar-centric band that went on to release Tolerance (1985) and Spitting Out Miracles (1987) and several singles and EPs whose B-sides were brought together in the compilation FriendLoverPlane (1988), all on the Fire label.

On 24 February 1990, the band released their most critically acclaimed album, Swagger, this time on a major label Chrysalis/Ensign. This was followed by Beatsongs, which was recorded in the United States and released in 1991. It was produced by Larry Hirsch. This second album on the major label was their highest charting, reaching no. 33 in the UK Albums Chart. A second compilation of rare B-sides and out-takes, FriendLoverPlane2 (Up in a Down World), was released in 1992.

The follow-up to Beatsongs was delayed until 1994, when the album Life Model was released on the Beggars Banquet label; it was followed by Rough Music in 1995. "Broken & Mended" from Life Model was the band's last single to chart and is a favourite at gigs. A long break and another label change to ArtStar preceded the release of Cavaliers in 2000. Following negotiations with EMI who now owned the rights to Swagger and Beatsongs, The Blue Aeroplanes made a surprise return to this major label. EMI re-released Swagger Deluxe as a 2-CD version in January 2006. This was followed by an album of new material called Altitude later that year, released on EMI's Harvest imprint. The group then recorded an album of cover versions of classic tracks that were originally recorded by artists signed to the Harvest label. The album, called Harvester, was released by EMI/Harvest in 2007.

As well as the two FriendLoverPlane compilations, several other compilations have been released in recent years. Huh! The Best of The Blue Aeroplanes (1987–1992) was released by EMI/Chrysalis in 1997 and featured many of the songs from Swagger and Beatsongs. Also in 1997, Warhol's 15 The Best of the Blue Aeroplanes (1985–1988) was released and covered the preceding period when the band was signed to Fire Records. In 1996 Fruit (Live 1983–1995) was released on Fire Records and covered 12 years of live performances recorded at various venues. Then in 2001, ArtStar released Weird Sh*t which featured both rare tracks and alternative versions of some of the band's best-known songs from Swagger through to 'Cavaliers.

In 2008 and 2009, limited-edition live albums were released and sold at the annual Christmas gig at Fiddlers in Bristol. Live in Cheltenham (2008) and Skyscrapers (2009) were limited to just 100 copies each and each featured songs not included on the other live CD. Their Christmas gig moved to The Fleece a few years later and is a staple in their touring calendar.

The band released a new album Welcome, Stranger! in January 2017 through Pledgemusic.

Live performances

They have played headlining gigs in small indie venues as well as supporting big acts such as R.E.M. and Siouxsie and the Banshees on major international tours, frontman Gerard Langley always wearing his trademark shades even at night in dark venues. Performances include the band's 1992 appearance at Glastonbury which was broadcast on BBC Radio 1, the finale at the Hammersmith Apollo when 12 guitarists were seen on stage performing "Breaking in My Heart" and their annual appearance at Fiddlers in Bristol which has now been relocated to the band's own venue, The Fleece.

In February 2016 the band played at the 6music festival at Colston Hall's Lantern venue, being introduced by Gideon Coe and in April 2016 they were personally chosen by curator Stewart Lee to play the ATP festival at Pontins Prestatyn.

In 2019 the band performed at the Glastonbury Festival on the Avalon Stage.

Discography
Studio albums
 Bop Art (1984), Party
 Tolerance (1985), Fire
 Spitting Out Miracles (1987), Fire
 Swagger (1990), Ensign
 Beatsongs, (1991), Ensign
 Life Model (1994), Beggars Banquet
 Rough Music (1995), Beggars Banquet
 Cavaliers & Roundheads (2000), Swarf Finger
 Altitude (2006), EMI/Harvest
 Harvester (2007), EMI/Harvest
 Anti-Gravity (2011), Art Star/Albino
 Welcome, Stranger! (2017), Art StarCulture Gun (2022), Art Star

Live album
 Fruit (Live 1983-1995) (1996), Fire

Compilation albums
 Friendloverplane (1988), Fire
 World View Blue (1990), Chrysalis
 Friendloverplane 2 (Up in a Down World) (1992), Ensign
 Weird Shit (One-Offs False Starts & Side Roads To The Wrong Part Of Town) (1996), Self-release
 Huh! The Best of The Blue Aeroplanes 1987–1992  (1997), Chrysalis
 Warhol's 15 – The Best Of The Blue Aeroplanes 1985–1988 (2002), Nectar

Singles and EPs
 "Action Painting & Other Original Works Of..." (EP) (1985), Fire Records (FIRE 2) - Action Painting / Le Petit Cadeau De Don Juan / Ashtrays From Mt. Etna / Police (38 Divinity)
 "Lover & Confidante And Other Stories of Travel Religion & Heartbreak" (EP) (1985), Fire Records (FIRE 8) - Lover & Confidante / Who Built This Station In The Midwest / Weird Heart / Breaking In My Heart
 "Tolerance" (EP) (1986), Fire Records BLAZE 12T - Tolerance (Remix) / Teaching English (Through Sex And Death) / The Couple In The Next Room / Complete Blessing
 "Bury Your Love Like Treasure" (EP) (1987), Fire Records BLAZE 23T - Bury Your Love Like Treasure / King Of The Soap Box / Vice King's Son / Continually Torn Apart
 "The Janice Long Session" (EP) (1988), Strange fruit / Night Trax SFNT009 - 
 "Veils of Colour" (EP) (1988), Fire Records BLAZE 24T - Veils Of Colour / Spitting Out Miracles (Re-mixed) / Arriving / Built In A Day
 "Jacket Hangs" (1990), Ensign ENY628 
 "...And Stones" (1990), Ensign ENY632 - ... And Stones (Remix Edit) / ... And Stones (Album version) 
 "The Loved" (EP) (1990), Ensign ENY636 - You (Are Loved) / You're Going To Need Somebody / Sweet Jane / World View Blue (Acoustic Version)
 "Yr Own World" (1991), Ensign ENY647
 "The Boy in the Bubble" (1991), Ensign ENY649
 "Stranger" (1992), Flexi-disc given out at Bristol University gig.
 "Up In A Down World" (EP)  (1993), Fantastic Plastic FP002 - Up In A Down World / Fun (Acoustic) / Breaking In My Heart / Mean Time
 "Broken & Mended EP" (1994), Beggars Banquet BBQ26T - Broken & Mended	/ Love Is / Star-Cross'd / Get Out!
 "Detective Song" (1994), Beggars Banquet BBQ39  
 "Sugared Almond EP" (1995), Beggars Banquet BBQ53 - Sugared Almond (New Version) / Scared (Scared Mix) / Bad Moon Rising / Broken And Mended (Acoustic Version)
 "China Brilliance Automotive" (2010), Albino Two Recordings ALBTW010 
 "Dead Tree! Dead Tree!" (2016), ArtStar AS CS 002

Compilation appearances
 Bludgeoned (1985). Includes different version of "Action Painting".
 Imminent Episode One (1985), Food. Includes an alternate version of "Outback Jazz".
 On The Dotted Line (1997), EMI. Two separate LPs - (There) included "Gunning the Works (live)" and (Here) included "Tolerance (live)"
 Great Fire of London (1989), Fire. Includes the uncredited version of Dave Brubeck's "Unsquare Dance" (an out-take from Bop Art), and a different version of "Gunning The Works".
 Lime Lizards (1991), CAS. Includes "Autumn Journal XV".
 Volume 2 (1991). Includes the original album version of "Aeroplane Blues" (pre-overdubs, etc.).
 Ruby Trax (1992), NME. Includes "Bad Moon Rising".
 NME Presents Viva! Eight (1992), NME. Includes "Yr Own World (live)".
 The Indie Scene 1985 – The Story of British Independent Music'' (1992). Includes "Action Painting".

Lineups

See also
 List of bands from Bristol
 List of record labels from Bristol
 Bristol record labels

References

External links
 Official website
 Blue Aeroplanes at Fire Records
 

Musical groups established in 1981
English new wave musical groups
English post-punk music groups
Musical groups from Bristol
Chrysalis Records artists
Beggars Banquet Records artists
Harvest Records artists
Fire Records (UK) artists